Loxocorys is a genus of moths of the family Crambidae. The genus was erected by Edward Meyrick in 1894, and has long been considered a synonym of Luma before it was reinstated as genus with the sole species Loxocorys sericea (Butler, 1879).
A phylogenetic analysis showed that Loxocorys is placed in the Spilomelinae tribe Wurthiini, and in genitalia morphology it shares similarities with Niphopyralis.

References

Crambidae genera
Taxa named by Edward Meyrick